Cult of the Dead Cow, also known as cDc or cDc Communications, is a computer hacker and DIY media organization founded in 1984 in Lubbock, Texas. The group maintains a weblog on its site, also titled "Cult of the Dead Cow". New media are released first through the blog, which also features thoughts and opinions of the group's members.

Timeline 

The group was formed in June 1984 at the Farm Pac slaughterhouse by Grandmaster Ratte' (aka Swamp Ratte'), Franken Gibe, Sid Vicious, and three BBS SysOps. 

In the 1980s the Cult of the Dead Cow organized and maintained a loose collective of affiliated BBSs across the US and Canada.  It was during this time that the cDc is credited with coining the term "31337" as an alternative spelling of "Eleet" or "Elite", an expression denoting skill or greatness in a person, place, or thing.

In December 1990, cDc member Drunkfux – the pseudonym of Jesse Dryden, the son of Jefferson Airplane drummer Spencer Dryden and grand nephew of Charlie Chaplin – gave birth to the modern hacker con. HoHoCon, usually held in Houston, Texas, was the first hacker conference which invited the participation of both journalists and law enforcement. In all, dFx hosted five annual HoHoCons.

In 1991, cDc was named "Sassiest Underground Computer Group" by Sassy magazine. Also in 1991, the group began distributing music in the form of cassette tape albums sold through its post office box. Many of these albums are now available online in their entirety.

October 1994 saw the creation of the cDc's Usenet newsgroup, alt.fan.cult-dead-cow. It was thus the first hacking group to have its own Usenet newsgroup.  In November of that year, the group claimed responsibility for giving Ronald Reagan Alzheimer's disease, claiming to have done so in 1986 with a blowgun.

The cDc declared war on the Church of Scientology in 1995 during the alt.religion.scientology controversy, stating 

In 1997, the cDc began distributing original MP3-format music on its website.

In August 1998, they presented their popular Back Orifice tool at DEF CON 6.

In February 2000, the cDc was the subject of an 11-minute documentary short titled "Disinformation". Also in February 2000, cDc member Mudge briefed President Bill Clinton on Internet security.

cDc communications
cDc communications is the parent organisation of Cult of the Dead Cow, one of three groups that fall under cDc communications. The other two are the Ninja Strike Force and Hacktivismo.

Ninja Strike Force
In 1996, the cDc announced the birth of its Ninja Strike Force, a group of "ninja" dedicated to achieving the goals of the cDc, an intervention task force both online and offline. The cDc opened the NSF Dojo in 2004. An "NSF Dojo" Member also operates a streaming radio station, which features recordings of hacker con presentations and other educational programming in addition to a wide range of musical styles and artists.

Membership in the NSF is granted by the cDc to those individuals who stand out in their support of the cDc and its ideals. Members are recognized for their abilities, capabilities, and being the best of the best in their skills.

In 2006 the Ninja Strike Force launched its own microsite.

Hacktivismo 

In late 1999, the cDc created Hacktivismo, an independent group under the cDc communications umbrella dedicated to the creation of anti-censorship technology in furtherance of human rights on the Internet. The group's beliefs are described fully in The Hacktivismo Declaration, which seeks to apply the Universal Declaration of Human Rights and the International Covenant on Civil and Political Rights to the Internet. Among Hacktivismo's beliefs include access to information as a basic human right. The organization partially shares Critical Art Ensemble's (CAE) belief in the value of secrecy, but challenges both with CAE and many hacktivists on the subject of civil disobedience. The cDc model is, instead, one of disruptive compliance. Disruptive, in this case, refers to disruptive technology; compliance refers back to the Internet and its original intent of constructive free-flow and openness. Hacktivismo has also authored its own software license agreement, the Hacktivismo Enhanced-Source Software License Agreement, which is source available (but not open source). Their work focuses on the development of software that empowers conduct forbidden by repression, rather than enabling (private or public) attacks on repressors. In general cDc hopes that open code can become the lingua franca of a hacktivism that seeks to wage peace, not war. While the term isn't used, the software described in cDc's "Waging of Peace on the Internet" would create a set of connections between dissidents that sound in technoliberationist terms, rhizomatic.

Crossover associations with other groups 
In addition to the obvious associations between Cult of the Dead Cow, Hacktivismo, and the Ninja Strike Force, the cDc also has crossover associations with several other organizations. These include the L0pht; founding members White Knight and Count Zero and final members Dildog and Mudge are all members of cDc. Additionally, The Nightstalker was a member of Youth International Party Line/Technology Assistance Program. Lord Digital, one of the founders of Mindvox, is a former member of LOD/H and a current member of the Sacrament of Transition. Red Knight was a member of the Masters of Deception. Also, RaD Man, a member of the Ninja Strike Force, is one of the founders of ACiD Productions. Another NSF member, Mark Hinge, is a founding member of the British hacker group The Syndicate Of London. Flack, another Ninja Strike Force member, was a co-founder of the horror "lit group" Soulz at Zero. Mudge later went on to program manage the CINDER program at DARPA, which aimed to detect 'insider threats' like the WikiLeaks sources.

Electronic publication 

During the 1980s, the cDc was well known throughout the BBS scene for their underground ezine, also called Cult of the Dead Cow. The group claims to have invented the ezine.

The Cult of the Dead Cow has been credited with coining the term "elite" as used in the hacker scene/computer underground in cDc textfiles of the 1980s.

The ezine has led to some criticism of the group over the years; in a 1994 episode of Geraldo entitled "Computer Vice," Geraldo Rivera referred to the group as "a bunch of sickos" for having published an article called "Sex with Satan," originally published in 1988.

Hacktivism 

In 1996, cDc member Omega used the term "hacktivism" in an email to other group members. The group has been active in hacktivist causes since that time.

Hong Kong Blondes 
In the late 1990s, the cDc claimed to have worked with a group of Chinese dissidents called "The Hong Kong Blondes." The group’s ostensible goal was to disrupt computer networks within the People's Republic of China in order to allow citizens to access censored content online. The Hong Kong Blondes were, ostensibly, one of the first hacktivist groups, though the group's existence and actions have proven to be an invented fiction. The cDc first spoke about the group publicly in a presentation at the 1997 Beyond HOPE Conference held at The Puck Building in New York City. Members claimed to have advised the group on strong encryption techniques. The cDc formally severed ties with the Hong Kong Blondes in December 1998. In 2015, former cDc member Oxblood Ruffin claimed without evidence that the hacking activities attributed to the Hong Kong Blondes were an invention intended to create a diversion and cover for the extraction of several Chinese pro-democracy activists. Asked about the group during a White House meeting in February 2000 organized by then National Security Advisor Richard A. Clarke with President Bill Clinton, Mudge admitted "We made them up."

Cyberwar 
On January 7, 1999, the cDc joined with an international coalition of hackers to denounce a call to cyberwar against the governments of China and Iraq.

Milošević trial 
When questioning Patrick Ball during his International War Crimes Tribunal in 2002, Slobodan Milošević asked Ball about his relationship with the cDc. Ball had given a talk and been a member of a cDc-sponsored panel on hacktivism at DEF CON 9 in 2001.

Goolag campaign 

In early 2006, the cDc launched the "Goolag" (a play on gulag, Soviet forced labour camps) campaign in response to Google's decision to comply with China's Internet censorship policy and censor search results in the mainland-Chinese version of its search engine. The campaign consists primarily of the use of a parody of Google's logo which reads "Goolag: Exporting censorship, one search at a time." The group encouraged readers to make t-shirts and other merchandise and donate any proceeds from their sale to Human Rights in China.

Students for a Free Tibet held an anti-Google rally in Dharamsala, India on February 14, 2006, employing the logo in a variety of ways. The cDc then issued a press release about the campaign, wherein it described Microsoft, Yahoo!, Google, and Cisco as the "Gang of Four" due to their respective policies of compliance with the Beijing government's Internet policies. The United States Congress was also called out on this issue in the release. This press release, originally entitled "Congress jerks off, gang of four reach for raincoats," was picked up by many news sources, as an abbreviated version of it was distributed by PR Web (with the altered title of "Cult of the Dead Cow (cDc) Launches Campaign Against Internet Censorship in China").

Tools 
The cDc has released several tools, for both hackers/system administrators and for the general public. Many of these are related to computer security and are sometimes dubbed "hacker tools".

The Automated Prayer Project 
The Automated Prayer Project, written by Javaman, is "a VT420 connected to a Sun Ultra5 via a serial cable which displays the output of a continuously running program. The signaling rate is limited to 9600 baud. The program itself cycles through the Rosary, displaying a new individual prayer once every thirty seconds. Each individual prayer is then sent out via UDP to a random machine on the Internet on a random port."

Back Orifice 

Back Orifice (often shortened to BO) is a computer program designed for remote system administration. It enables a user to control a computer running Microsoft Windows operating system from a remote location. The name is a pun on Microsoft BackOffice Server software. The program debuted at DEF CON 6 on August 1, 1998. It was the brainchild of Sir Dystic. According to the group, its purpose was to demonstrate the lack of security in Microsoft's operating system Windows 98.

Back Orifice 2000 

Back Orifice 2000 (often shortened to BO2k) is a computer program that is similar in function to Back Orifice. Back Orifice 2000 debuted on July 10, 1999 at DEF CON 7. The original code was written by Dildog. Whereas the original Back Orifice was limited to the Windows 95 and Windows 98 operating systems, BO2k also supports Windows NT, Windows XP and Windows 2000. Some BO2k client functionality has also been implemented for *nix-systems. In addition, BO2k was released under the GPL. As of 2012, BO2k is being actively developed.

Camera/Shy 

Camera/Shy, originally called Peek-a-Booty,  was the first Hacktivismo project released. It debuted in 2002 at the H.O.P.E. 2k2 convention in New York City. It is a steganographic tool that scans for and delivers decrypted content directly from the world wide web.

NBName 

NBName is a computer program that can be used to carry out denial-of-service attacks that can disable NetBIOS services on Windows machines. It was written by Sir Dystic and released July 29, 2000 at the DEF CON 8 convention in Las Vegas.

ScatterChat 

ScatterChat is an encrypted instant messaging client based on Gaim. It was written by J. Salvatore Testa II and released at the H.O.P.E. Number Six conference in New York City on July 22, 2006. It provides encryption as well as integrated onion routing with Tor, and secure file transfers. Various flaws in the software have been elaborated by researchers.

The Six/Four System 

The Six/Four System is a censorship-resistant network proxy written by Mixter, a member of both cDc and Hacktivismo. It works by using "trusted peers" to relay network connections over SSL encrypted links. Hacktivismo and the cDc further gained notoriety in 2003 when the Six/Four System became the first product of a hacker group to receive approval from the United States Department of Commerce for export of strong encryption.

SMBRelay and SMBRelay2 

SMBRelay and SMBRelay2 are computer programs that can be used to carry out SMB man-in-the-middle attacks on Windows machines. They were written by Sir Dystic and released March 21, 2001 at the @lantacon convention in Atlanta, Georgia.

Torpark 

XeroBank Browser (formerly known as Torpark) is a variant of the Portable Firefox web browser with Tor built into it. Torpark is intended for use on portable media such as a USB flash drive but it can also be used on any hard disk drive. cDc/Hacktivismo co-released v.1.5.0.7 along with Steve Topletz on September 19, 2006.

Whisker 

Whisker is a project authored by Rain Forest Puppy that is no longer in development. It checked for thousands of known security vulnerabilities in web servers. Whisker Version 1.4 was co-released by the cDc at DEF CON 8 in 2000.

See also 
 2600: The Hacker Quarterly
 Chaos Computer Club
 DEADBEEF
 H.O.P.E.
 Legion of Doom
 Masters of Deception
 Operation Cybersnare
 Phrack

Notes

References

External links 

 
Wikipedia articles with ASCII art
Organizations established in 1984
Hacker groups